Podocarpus pseudobracteatus is a species of conifer in the family Podocarpaceae. It is found in Indonesia and Papua New Guinea.

References

pseudobracteatus
Least concern plants
Taxonomy articles created by Polbot
Taxa named by David John de Laubenfels